Horsefield may refer to:

People
 John Horsefield (1792–1854), English handloom weaver and amateur botanist
 Andrew Horsefield (born 1982), American professional wrestler, ring name Andrew Pendelton III
 F. J. Horsefield, author of the book Life in a Cornish Village

Other uses
 Mrs Horsefield, a fictional character in the novel Candyfloss
 Conrose Park or the Horsefield, a park in Canada

See also
 Horsfield (disambiguation)